Antarvedi, or Antarvedipalem, is a village in the Sakhinetipalle mandal, or tehsil, located in the Konaseema district of the Andhra Pradesh state in India. The village is situated at the place where the Bay of Bengal and Vashista Godavari, a distributary of the Godavari River, meet.

Antarvedi was named in honour of the Lord as "Narasimhakshetra".

Description
Antarvedi, in terms of geographical surface area, covers about 4 square miles (6.4 km). The village contains the widely revered Lord Sri Lakshminarasimha Swamy temple, located opposite Vasishta Godavari, and it is said that Antarvedi is "the second Varanasi by the grace of the Lord." A launch pad allows visitors to land on the small island at the other side of the Godavari River - from this point, travel can then be undertaken to the convergence point of the river and the ocean.

Geography
According to Kopanathi Krishnamma Varma, layout of the temple complex has great significance with the geometry of the delta itself and more to be studied in terms of current and force of the confluence at the location.

See also
 Sri Lakshmi Narasimha Swamy Temple, Antarvedi

See also 
Neelakanteshwara temple

References

External links
 https://web.archive.org/web/20120327162102/http://eastgodavari.nic.in/Antharvedi.html
 http://www.kakinadainfo.com/antarvedi-
 official site
 Antarvedi Temple History

Villages in Konaseema district